The Macha Lake Open is a tennis tournament of the ITF Women's Circuit played on outdoor clay courts. It has been held in Česká Lípa, Czech Republic, since 1993 and is classified as a $60,000 event.

In 2022, the venue was moved from TO Staré Splavy in Staré Splavy to Sport Česká Lípa in Česká Lípa.

Past finals

Singles

Doubles

External links
 ITF search
 Website

ITF Women's World Tennis Tour
Clay court tennis tournaments
Tennis tournaments in the Czech Republic
Recurring sporting events established in 1993